Luca Dalla Libera is an Italian slalom canoeist who competed in the 1990s. He won a bronze medal in the C-1 team event at the 1993 ICF Canoe Slalom World Championships in Mezzana.

References

Italian male canoeists
Living people
Year of birth missing (living people)
Medalists at the ICF Canoe Slalom World Championships
20th-century Italian people